The President of the Ukrainian People's Republic in exile was an official position of the Government of the Ukrainian People's Republic in exile after World War II. The post was created out of the "Chairman of the Directorate of Ukraine".

History

Ukrainian People's Republic
On July 10, 1948 there was adopted a "Provisional law about the reorganisation of the State Center of the Ukrainian People's Republic in exile" which was coordinated between various Ukrainian political organizations. Andriy Livytskyi, who was a chairman of the Directorate of Ukraine, was confirmed by the Ukrainian National Council as the President of the Ukrainian People's Republic in exile. From 1948 to 1992 there were four presidents of UNR in exile. On March 15, 1992 an extraordinary session of the Ukrainian National Council adopted a resolution "About handing over authority of the State Center of UNR in exile to the state power in Kyiv and termination of work of the State Center of UNR in exile". The last president Mykola Plaviuk officially handed over his presidential powers to the newly elected President of Ukraine Leonid Kravchuk.

Under the 1948 law, the president was to be elected or confirmed by the Ukrainian National Council. He had a right to participate in sessions of the Ukrainian National Council and its presidium, represent the State Center of UNR in exile in foreign relationships, appoint a head of government and, on the recommendations of that head of government, members of the government. In exceptional cases the President could dissolve the Ukrainian National Council on the proposal of the government. The government of UNR was responsible and accountable to both the President as well as the council. All presidents except the last one held the title for the rest of their lives.

The UNR in exile also had a position of a vice-president.

Russian invasion

In March 2022, the United States national security officials has discussed plans to establish Volodymyr Zelenskyy's government-in-exile in the event the national capital Kyiv falls to the Russian forces and installs a puppet regime. Ultimately, President Zelenskyy publicly vowed to remain in Ukraine and lead resistance against Russian forces.

List of presidents

See also 
 President of Ukraine
 List of leaders of Ukraine
 Ukrainian People's Republic
 Viktor Yanukovych
 Government of the Ukrainian People's Republic in exile

References

Further reading
 Shulhyn, O. Without territory. Ideology and work of the UNR government in exile. Paris, 1931
 Vynnychenko, V. Testament to fighters for liberation. Kyiv, 1991

External links
 Unknown Ukraine. Film 108 "Returned Independence". National Cinematheque of Ukraine. 1993
 State Center of the Ukrainian People's Republic

 
Political history of Ukraine
1948 establishments in Ukraine
+
Presidency of Ukraine
20th century in Ukraine
1992 disestablishments in Ukraine